
Valuas is a restaurant  in Venlo, Netherlands. It is a fine dining restaurant that was awarded one Michelin star for the period 2006–present.

GaultMillau awarded the restaurant 16 out of 20 points.

Head chef and half-owner of Valuas is Eric Swaghoven. His brother Marcel Swaghoven owns the other half and acts as Maître d' and sommelier

The brothers Swaghoven were raised in a hospitality family. Their father was once running Hotel Wilhelmina and later operated the bistro Valuas. Due to illness the brothers were effectively running the bistro since the mid nineteen-nineties. They own the place since 1998.

Valuas is a member of Les Patrons Cuisiniers.

Awards
 2013:  Lodewijk van der Grinten Ondernemersprijs

See also
List of Michelin starred restaurants in the Netherlands

References 

Restaurants in the Netherlands
Michelin Guide starred restaurants in the Netherlands
Restaurants in Limburg (Netherlands)
Buildings and structures in Venlo